Tentoriceps is a monotypic genus of cutlassfish, family Trichiuridae, from the Indian and Pacific Oceans. The sole species is Tentoriceps cristatus. Its common name is crested hairtail.

Distribution
Tentoriceps cristatus has Indo-West Pacific distribution: it is found in the Indian Ocean (including the Red Sea) and in the Western Pacific Ocean, between the Tasman Sea and southern Japan.

Description
Typical for cutlassfishes, Tentoriceps cristatus has extremely elongate and strongly compressed, ribbon-like body, tapering to a point. The dorsal profile of head is evenly convex. It grows to a maximum length of about  TL, but common length is  TL.

Fisheries
Tentoriceps cristatus is a minor commercial species caught mainly mixed with other cutlassfish in southeast Asian countries.

References

Trichiuridae
Monotypic marine fish genera
Fish of the Indian Ocean
Fish of the Pacific Ocean
Taxa named by Gilbert Percy Whitley